"Derrière l'amour" is a song by Johnny Hallyday, It was released as a single and spent six consecutive weeks at no. 1 on the singles sales chart in France (from 3 to 16 June 1976 and from 22 July to 18 August 1976).

Background and composition 
The song was written by French lyricist Pierre Delanoë over a composition by Toto Cutugno.

Toto Cutugno himself recorded an Italian version with lyrics by Vito Pallavicini, titled "Dietro l'amore". The Italian version was released by him as a single in Italy.

Track listing

Johnny Hallyday version ("Derrière l'amour") 
7" single Philips 6042 16 (France, etc.)
 "Derrière l'amour (4:40)"
 "Joue pas de rock'n'roll pour moi" ("Don't Play Your Rock 'n' Roll to Me") (3:33)

Toto Cutugno version ("Dietro l'amore") 
7" single CBS 4465 (Italy)
 "Dietro l'amore"
 "Come ieri, come oggi, come sempre"

Charts 
 Johnny Hallyday version ("Derrière l'amour")

References 

1976 songs
1976 singles
Johnny Hallyday songs
French songs
Philips Records singles
Number-one singles in France
Songs written by Toto Cutugno
Songs written by Pierre Delanoë
Songs with lyrics by Vito Pallavicini